Carmelita 'Carmen' Anderson (maiden name Bishop) is a Norfolk Islander lawn bowls international.

Bowls career

World Championship
Anderson won the gold medal in the singles at the 1996 World Outdoor Bowls Championship in Adelaide. In 2020 she was selected for the 2020 World Outdoor Bowls Championship in Australia.

Commonwealth Games
She won Norfolk Island's first medal at the 1994 Commonwealth Games in Victoria, Canada, when she won a bronze medal. In 2022, she competed in the women's pairs and the Women's fours at the 2022 Commonwealth Games.

Asia Pacific
Anderson is one of the most successful female bowlers of all time at the Asia Pacific Bowls Championships where she has won eleven medals including five golds (four in singles competition). Her eleventh medal came at the 2019 Asia Pacific Bowls Championships in the Gold Coast, Queensland.

Personal life
She holds Australian citizenship and received the Medal of the Order of Australia in 1999.

References

Living people
Commonwealth Games bronze medallists for Norfolk Island
Bowls players at the 1994 Commonwealth Games
Bowls players at the 2022 Commonwealth Games
Norfolk Island sportspeople
Australian female bowls players
Commonwealth Games medallists in lawn bowls
Bowls World Champions
1955 births
Recipients of the Medal of the Order of Australia
Filipino emigrants to Australia
Norfolk Island bowls players
Medallists at the 1994 Commonwealth Games